This is an incomplete list of Munchausen by proxy cases. Also known as Factitious disorder imposed on another, Munchausen by proxy is a condition in which a caregiver creates the appearance of health problems in another person, typically their own child. This may include injuring the proxy or altering test samples. The caregiver then presents the proxy as being sick or injured. Permanent injury or death of the proxy may occur as a result of the disorder. Although the caregiver typically does not benefit from their own behaviour, there are notable cases where the caregiver defrauds charities, insurance companies or local friends and family under the guise of using this for the aid of the proxy.

This list is not exhaustive and may not reflect all cases. List is ordered alphabetically by the surname of each party.

Notable victims
 Gypsy-Rose Blanchard (see Murder of Dee Dee Blanchard). Gypsy-Rose was Dee Dee's proxy and suffered over a decade of medical abuse before relenting and killing Dee Dee with the help of her autistic boyfriend, Nick; Gypsy-Rose and Nick were later convicted and sent to prison.
 Jennifer Bush: used in a large-scale fraud involving political elites who saw the girl's case as an example of the need for medical reform; mother Kathy Bush was later discovered to have caused Jennifer's symptoms in a case of Munchausen by proxy.
 Olivia Gant: killed by the removal of her feeding tubes after years of medical abuse by her mother, Kelly Renee Turner-Gant; Gant was convicted in 2022.
 Julie Gregory: childhood victim of her mother's Munchausen by proxy, which she survived and later documented in her memoir, Sickened: The Memoir of a Munchausen by Proxy Childhood.
 Hannah Milbrandt: girl who was convinced that she suffered from terminal cancer by her parents in a situation of Munchausen by proxy, using community donations in a widescale act of fraud. This is one of the first contested Munchausen by proxy cases, causing a debate about whether it was a situation of true Munchausen, or just medical fraud.
 Garnett Spears: killed due to brain swelling induced by repeated salt poisoning by mother Lacey Spears, who was later convicted of murder.

Notable perpetrators

 Beverley Allitt: British serial killer with Munchausen by proxy, who purposely sickened and killed a number of minor children.
 Richard Angelo: American serial killer responsible for overdosing his patients in a hospital where he worked as a nurse in attempts to resuscitate them and look like a "hero", as well as have a sense of "power".
 Dee Dee Blanchard: Dee Dee, a Hurricane Katrina survivor, faked multiple chronic illnesses of her daughter, Gypsy-Rose Blanchard, both for sympathy and charitable benefits. Her abuse of Gypsy-Rose led to the girl eventually aiding a secret boyfriend in the murder of Dee Dee, after which the abuse was finally discovered. Gypsy-Rose's experience has been dramatized in movies and TV shows.
 Ameh Bozorg in the memoir Not Without My Daughter is not only convinced that she is suffering from some sort of chronic illness, but she also convinces her adult brother, a medical doctor, that he will become ill himself if he bathes because he will "wash all the cells off his skin" and leave himself open to pathogens. Her brother, a trained medical doctor, initially finds this silly, but as the memoir progresses, he begins to follow his older sister's bizarre regimen of not bathing or following western healthcare standards. Notably the book does not suggest whether this is true Munchausen by proxy or behaviour based on anti-western sentiment (the book is set shortly after the Islamic Revolution).
 Kristen Gilbert: American serial killer responsible for deliberately injecting patients to send them into critical states, hoping to get attention from coming to the rescue and giving notice to the increasing deaths she caused. When the murders didn't work, she'd harass and stalk employees and workplaces, once even calling in a bomb threat.
 Wendi Michelle Scott: mother charged with child abuse after purposely sickening her four-year-old daughter.
 Shauna Dee Taylor, a Floridian woman who medically abused all 10 of her children, with a specific fascination with their internal organs; she poisoned her infant daughter in a 2013 incident and caused the child to suffer liver damage, setting up a sympathy donation fundraiser page online for the child.
 Marybeth Roe Tinning American murderer and suspected serial killer who was convicted in New York State of the murder of her ninth child, 4-month-old daughter Tami Lynne, on December 20, 1985. She is suspected to be similarly involved in the previous deaths of her eight children, all of which took place within the span of fourteen years.

Fictional examples
 Boh, an obese infant child from the Japanese 2001 animated feature film Spirited Away, is kept in a padded room by his mother and convinced that he is too sickly to go outside, led by his mother to believe that he will catch germs if he wanders from the room. He later relents and leaves the room, thus meeting new friends and helping to save the life of his mother's gravely injured apprentice.
Cheryl, a parent in the 2013 Lifetime movie The Good Mother (played by Helen Slater) poisons her teenage daughter to death with ricin, then moves onto her next daughter, while basking in the constant sympathy she receives as a grieving mother with terminally-ill children. She tells people that the unnamed "illness" is a genetic condition of sorts, poisoning the daughters until a family friend discovers the abuse and tries to report it.
 Colin Craven in various adaptations of The Secret Garden by Frances Hodgson Burnett (most notably the 1993 feature film by the same name), is kept in a single room for most of his life, convinced by his father and the head servant that he is crippled, unable to walk, and too sickly to survive in the outdoor air. His cousin Mary befriends him and takes him outside to the garden, proving to him that he is perfectly well.
 Adora Crellin in the miniseries Sharp Objects poisons her daughter Marian, in a case of Munchausen by proxy that goes unsolved until a later investigation.
 Natalie Drax from The 9th Life of Louis Drax: causes several injuries to her son, Louis, during his lifetime due to her Munchausen by proxy condition.
 Edward "Eddie" Kaspbrak from the Stephen King novel It developed hypochondriac behaviours after a childhood living with his single mother in a situation of Munchausen by proxy.
 Dorothy Mann from Monkey Shines: Dorothy is annoyed when her quadriplegic son shows signs that he might be able to recover and live a normal life, including the possibility that he might move again and that he can have a romantic relationship. She sells her own house, moves in with him, lies to him and tells him that he is incapable, and attempts to cut off any female relationships he has. The original novel did not feature these elements this heavily.
 Mandy Phillips from Fragile: British little girl with osteogenesis imperfecta, a condition purposely worsened by obsessed nurse Charlotte when she notices the girl's bones beginning to heal.
 Esme Stoller from Love You to Death: a fictional cosplay fan and victim of her mother's Munchausen by proxy, told that she has cancer and developmental delays; Esme is loosely based on real-life victim Gypsy-Rose Blanchard.

References

Munchausen by proxy
Factitious disorders